Amanda Theodosia Jones (October 19, 1835 – March 31, 1914) was an American author and inventor, most noted for inventing a vacuum method of canning called the Jones Process.

Jones was descended from Puritan, Huguenot, Quaker and Methodist ancestors. Her forefathers were among the patriots of the American Revolution. She wrote a number of war poems during the Civil War. These were published, with others, in book form. Ill health for a number of years made it impossible for her to keep up her literary work. Some of her poems appeared in Scribner's Magazine while others were published in the Century, Our Continent, and other journals. She published a volume of verse entitled A Prairie Idyl and Other Poems. She made her home in Chicago, Illinois.

Early life and education
Jones was born in East Bloomfield, New York, on October 19, 1835, the fourth child of Henry and Mary Alma (Mott) Jones. She attended district schools in East Bloomfield and Black Rock, New York; she completed normal school training at the East Aurora Academy in New York and began teaching at the age of fifteen. In 1859, she contracted tuberculosis and spent over a year and a half recovering from the illness. Although she overcame the primary phase of the illness, Jones never fully recovered and would undergo spa treatments and alternative medicine practices to deal with the long term difficulties.

Influence of spiritualism
Influenced by the writings of Thomas Dick and the spiritualism movement, Jones became a convert to spiritualism in 1854 and believed herself to be a medium. In 1869, believing that the spirits wanted her there, she moved to Chicago, where she wrote for a number of periodicals, including Western Rural, Universe, Interior, and Bright Sides.

Patents and inventions – 1872–1880
While working as an editor in Chicago, Jones allegedly befriended a doctor by the name of Johnathon Andrews. He often was known as an advocate and practitioner of unorthodox healing methods on the basis that “love transcended death”. Jones, with her interest and background in spirituality, was enthusiastic about Andrews’’ views on medicine and enlisted his help in battling her ailments following her bout with tuberculosis. For five years, Andrews allegedly treated Jones using air baths, a treatment where the patient would spend a period of time in a tank full of compressed air. 

In 1872, Jones developed a vacuum canning process for preserving food, with the help of Professor Leroy C. Cooley of Albany, who was the brother-in-law of her sister Emily. At the time, food safety and preservation was only beginning to be understood. While canning food had been relatively popular for European militaries, the system had its problems. The popular system of canning at that time, invented in 1810 by Nicolas-Francois Appert, required food to be thoroughly cooked before being stored, often leaving the food mushy and tasteless. This preserved food was also often canned in tin cans, which posed difficulty for consumers since can openers had not yet been invented. This process was only attainable using large machinery and manufacturing resources, causing consumers to rely on purchasing preserved foods instead of being able to do it at home. 

The Jones Method involved steaming sealed jars filled with fruits and vegetables in a light syrup, fruit juice, or water, to an internal temperature of 120०F, forcing the air out of the jar and thus creating an airtight seal which would protect the food from oxygen that fuels the growth of bacteria. Jones’ invention would allow for food to be preserved uncooked, allowing fresh fruits and vegetables to be enjoyed later in the season. Her invention allowed for easier opening, using a glass jar and vacuum sealed lid instead of a seam sealed tin can, and made the act of food preservation more attainable to people at home. 

On June 3, 1873, Cooley obtained a patent on an apparatus for preserving fruit which he assigned to Jones. On the same day, a second patent was issued to both Cooley and Jones for their process, and two more patents were issued solely to Jones for her improved jar. Later, on June 24 of the same year, Cooley obtained a patent for the device that removes air from jars, making the patent the fifth and final to constitute the Jones Preserving Process. 

In 1910, Jones published A Psychic Autobiography where it was revealed Jones’ two primary advisors, one of which was Andrews, had been dead at the time they allegedly advised her. Jones claims their influence and guidance had been gained through seances which she frequently attended.

Again following the advice of the spirits she communicated with, she developed another invention, an oil burner, which she patented in 1880. However, her attempts to establish  businesses based on her inventions were unsuccessful, and she returned to writing, publishing A Prairie Idyll in 1882. There is one reference (Stanley, Autumn – See Bibliography) that maintains she has a patent for a Ready-Opener Tin Can, but that is the only, unsupported, reference to this patent.

Following the invention of the Jones Preserving Process and the sale of the Women’s Canning and Preserving Company, Jones continues inventing, staking claim to the oil burner, several types of valves, and a form of the tin can opener, giving her six patents in total.

Founding of Women's Canning and Preserving Company – 1890

A strong supporter of women's rights and suffrage, she founded the Women's Canning and Preserving Company in Chicago in 1890, which employed only women. In an address to her employees, Jones said that "This is a woman's industry. No man will vote our stock, transact our business, keep our books, pronounce on women's wages, supervise our factories. Give men whatever work is suitable, but keep the governing power. This is a business training school for working women – you with all the rest. Here is a mission; let it be fulfilled." When this venture failed in 1893, she left Chicago for Junction City, Kansas, where two of her sisters lived.

The business saw considerable profits in the first year, attracting investors that expected to see greater profits. A group of investors brought the canning business, with dispute over whether Jones willingly sold the company or if she was pushed out.

Later life
Jones continued to work with both of her inventions, obtaining patents on the canning process in 1903, 1905, and 1906, and additional patents relating to the oil burner in 1904, 1912, and 1914. She continued to publish occasional literary works, including the Rubaiyat of Solomon and Other Poems in 1905.

Following the Spanish–American War the U.S. Navy began investigating the transition from coal fired ships to oil. In 1904 they released a 489-page report which detailed extensively a comparison between coal and oil. Jones was asked to write a technical review of the report for Engineer: With which is Incorporated Steam Engineering. According to her obituary she was paid liberally for her contribution of four articles in 1904 and 1905. Those articles are online at the HathiTrust:
 THE LIQUID FUEL PROBLEM Part I (Vol 41 – 1904 – pages 821–822) (A Review of the Completed "Report of the U.S. Navy Liquid Fuel Board,issued Sept., 1904).
 THE LIQUID FUEL PROBLEM – II (Vol 41 – 1904 – pages 855–856)
 THE LIQUID FUEL PROBLEM – III (Vol 42 – 1905 – page 90)
 THE LIQUID FUEL PROBLEM – IV (Vol.42 – 1905 pages 108–109)

In 1910, she published her autobiography, A Psychic Autobiography, which focused on her interest in spiritualism. Late in her life, she moved to Brooklyn, New York, to pursue business interests, where she died of influenza in 1914. She was listed in Who's Who in America for 1912–13 and in Woman's Who's Who in America for 1914–15.

She is buried in Riverside Cemetery, Cleveland, Ohio in her brother William's plot.

Works
She quit teaching in 1854 after her first poem was published by the Ladies' Repository of Cincinnati. In 1861, she published Ulah, and Other Poems; a second book of verse, Poems, was published in 1867. Her health had been fragile since contracting tuberculosis in 1859; after the publication of Poems, she spent a year recuperating at the home of her widowed mother in Wisconsin.

Books
Jones published six books in her lifetime. All are available online at the Internet Archive.
 Ulah: And Other Poems. Jones, Amanda T.  Buffalo: H.H. Otis. 1861
 Poems. By Amanda T. Jones, Published/Created: New York, Hurd and Houghton, 1867.
 A Prairie Idyl, and Other Poems. Published/Created: Chicago, Jansen, McClurg & company, 1882.
 Rubáiyát of Solomon, and Other Poems. By Amanda T. Jones; Introduction by J. N. Larned. Published/Created: New York, Alden brothers, 1905.
 Poems, 1854–1906, by Amanda T. Jones. Published/Created: New York, Alden Brothers, 1906.
 A Psychic Autobiography / by Amanda T. Jones; with introduction by James H. Hyslop. Published/Created: New York: Greaves Publishing Co., c1910.

Ladies Repository of Cincinnati Publications
Between 1855 and 1864 Jones published frequently in the Ladies Repository. These poems, along with one she published in Overland Monthly and Out West magazine in 1894, are available at the University of Michigan's Making of America Journals digital library.
 "The Death of the Old Year" Volume: 15, Issue: 12, Dec 1855, pp. 736
 "The Music of the Soul" Volume: 15, Issue: 11, Nov 1855, pp. 678
 "There is a God" Volume: 15, Issue: 4, Apr 1855, pp. 242
 "Visions" Volume: 15, Issue: 10, Oct 1855, pp. 616
 "Dream-Land" Volume: 16, Issue: 8, Aug 1856, pp. 458
 "Glen Elgin" Volume: 16, Issue: 7, July 1856, pp. 424
 "My Spirit Lute" Volume: 16, Issue: 9, Sept 1856, pp. 544
 "The Child – The Maiden – The Mother" Volume: 16, Issue: 3, Mar 1856, pp. 155
 "The Kind of the North" Volume: 16, Issue: 4, Apr 1856, pp. 217
 "Life's Warfare" Volume: 17, Issue: 1, Jan 1857, pp. 3
 "Our Playmates Grave" Volume: 17, Issue: 8, Aug 1857, pp. 453
 "Prayer and Praise" Volume: 17, Issue: 2, Feb 1857, pp. 71
 "The Silver Chalice" Volume: 17, Issue: 11, Nov 1857, pp. 684
 "Trial and Delivery – The Messenger" Volume: 17, Issue: 6, June 1857, pp. 340
 "Who Knoweth the Heart" Volume: 17, Issue: 4, Apr 1857, pp. 199
 "Hide and Seek" Volume: 18, Issue: 11, Nov 1858, pp. 652
 "Locust Leaves" Volume: 18, Issue: 1, Jan 1858, pp. 32
 "Peace" Volume: 18, Issue: 5, May 1858, pp. 260
 "Spring Winds" Volume: 18, Issue: 4, Apr 1858, pp. 208
 "The Flower-Language of the Heart" Volume: 18, Issue: 7, July 1858, pp. 410
 "The Price of Blood" Volume: 18, Issue: 8, Aug 1858, pp. 476
 "The World" Volume: 18, Issue: 11, Nov 1858, pp. 663
 "Happy Days" Volume: 19, Issue: 3, Mar 1859, pp. 133
 "Heaven" Volume: 19, Issue: 2, Feb 1859, pp. 96
 "The Reign of Truth" Volume: 19, Issue: 5, May 1859, pp. 262
 "The Tide of Life" Volume: 19, Issue: 6, June 1859, pp. 352
 "The Willow Tree" Volume: 19, Issue: 11, Nov 1859, pp. 667
 "Charity" Volume: 22, Issue: 1, Jan 1862, pp. 34
 "Day and Night" Volume: 22, Issue: 8, Aug 1862, pp. 498
 "Les Souvenirs" Volume: 22, Issue: 12, Dec 1862, pp. 739
 "The South Wind" Volume: 22, Issue: 10, Oct 1862, pp. 628
 "Morta, A Vision of the Fates" Volume: 23, Issue: 3, Mar 1863, pp. 180
 "The Harp of Columbia" Volume: 23, Issue: 1, Jan 1863, pp. 36
 "The Ministry of Life" Volume: 23, Issue: 2, Feb 1863, pp. 96
 "Thou Finder of Flaws" Volume: 23, Issue: 8, Aug 1863, pp. 490
 "My Glade" Volume: 24, Issue: 9, Sept 1864, pp. 533
 "Hawaii" Overland monthly and Out West magazine. / Volume: 24, Issue: 139, July 1894, pp. 44

Notes

References

Further reading
The following books have articles about Jones:
 Vare, Ethlie Ann, Greg Ptacek, and Ethlie Ann Vare. 1988. Mothers of Invention: From the Bra to the Bomb: Forgotten Women & Their Unforgettable Ideas. New York: Morrow. (pp. 105–107)
 Wilson, James Grant, and John Fiske. 1889. Appleton's Cyclopedia of American Biography. New York [N.Y.]: D. Appleton and Co., Vol. 3, page 463. (Short Bio) (Available Online as full text PDF)
 Cefrey, Holly. 2003. The Inventions of Amanda Jones: The Vacuum Method of Canning and Food Preservation. New York: PowerKids Press. (Juvenile book)
 Casey, Susan. 1997. Women Invent: Two Centuries of Discoveries that Have Shaped our World. Chicago, Ill: Chicago Review Press. (pp. 4–5)
 Altman, Linda Jacobs. 1997. Women Inventors. New York: Facts On File. (pp. 1–11)
 Macdonald, Anne L. 1992. Feminine Ingenuity: Women and Invention in America. New York: Ballantine Books.
 McHenry, Robert. 1983. Famous American Women: A Biographical Dictionary from Colonial Times to the Present. New York: Dover. (page 214)
 James, Edward T., Janet Wilson James, and Paul S. Boyer. 1971. Notable American Women, 1607–1950: A Biographical Dictionary. Cambridge, Mass: Belknap Press of Harvard University Press. pp. 284–85.

 Stanley, Autumn. 1993. Mothers and Daughters of Invention: Notes for a Revised History of Technology. Metuchen, N.J.: Scarecrow Press. (Page 64) (Only reference to the Ready-Opener Tin Can patent)  Online

External links
 
 The American Experience
 Making of America – 37 poems published by Amanda T. Jones between 1855 and 1894
 Geary County (Kansas) Blog on Amanda Jones (Accessed 25 Nov 2015)
 Femilogue (10 Oct 2012) (Accessed 25 Nov 2015)
 Kelly, Kate. America Comes Alive (Accessed 25 Nov 2015)

1835 births
1914 deaths
19th-century American inventors
Women inventors
People from East Bloomfield, New York
19th-century American writers
19th-century American women writers
20th-century American writers
20th-century American women writers
Wikipedia articles incorporating text from A Woman of the Century